Hot Stove League is a South Korean television series that aired on SBS TV from December 13, 2019, to February 14, 2020. The series stars Namkoong Min, Park Eun-bin, Oh Jung-se, and Jo Byeong-kyu. It revolves around a baseball team named Dreams, which has been the worst in the league for four consecutive years.

Hot Stove League received critical acclaim and several awards, including Best Drama at the 56th Baeksang Arts Awards. Namkoong won his first Grand Prize (Daesang) at the 28th SBS Drama Awards.

Synopsis
The Dreams are a Korean professional baseball team that have placed last in the league for the past four seasons. When their general manager steps down, the team hires Baek Seung-soo, who has managed several championship winning sports teams, as his replacement, despite Seung-soo having zero experience with managing a baseball team. Facing shrinking budgets, infighting between the coaching staff and a team deeply set in their ways, Seung-soo uses his outsider's insight and the help of operations manager Se-young and Jae-hee to upend the Dreams' culture in a bid to create a championship winning team, despite the looming fact that every team he has managed before has folded after winning the championship.

Cast

Main
 Namkoong Min as Baek Seung-soo
The new general manager of the Dreams who was hired despite having zero experience managing a baseball team. He has a "golden resume", leading wrestling, ice hockey and handball teams to championships, but they all end up folding afterwards due to circumstances outside his control. He doesn't have a particularly nice personality but he is determined to make the team the best in the league. 
 Park Eun-bin as Lee Se-young
The Dreams' operations manager. She is the only female manager in the league and is very passionate about her team despite their poor fortunes. Though she has been working in this field for ten years, she never gives up.
 Oh Jung-se as Kwon Kyeong-min
The president of the team and a junior managing director with Jaesong Group, which owns the Dreams, and the nephew of its chairman. He plans to shut down the Dreams as it is unprofitable, and hires Baek Seung-soo to help him do so, but soon comes into conflict with him when Seung-soo puts real effort into making the team successful.
 Jo Byeong-kyu as Han Jae-hee
Se-young's co-worker at the operations team. He got the job through his connections, but as time goes by he shows his passion for the team and works hard. It is suggested that the reason for his change in attitude is because he likes Se-young.

Supporting

Dreams office
 Son Jong-hak as Go Kang-seon, CEO of the Dreams team.
 Lee Jun-hyeok as Go Se-hyeok, scout team leader.
 Yoon Byung-hee as Yang Won-seop, scout team member.
 Kim Do-hyun as Yoo Kyeong-taek, analysis team leader.
 Kim Soo-jin as Lim Mi-seon, head of marketing team.
 Park Jin-woo as Byeon Chi-hoon, marketing team leader.
 Kim Ki-moo as Jang Woo-seok, scout team deputy head.

Dreams players
 Hong Ki-joon as Jang Jin-woo, the oldest pitcher.
 Chae Jong-hyeop as Yoo Min-ho, a rising pitcher.
 Jo Han-sun as Lim Dong-gyu, a cleanup hitter.
 Cha Yup as Seo Yeong-joo, the chief catcher.
 Kim Dong-won as Kwak Han-young, an infielder.

Dreams coaching staff
 Lee Eol as Yoon Seong-bok, the head coach.
 Son Kwang-up as Choi Yong-goo, the pitching coach.
 Kim Min-sang as Lee Cheol-min, the bench coach.
 Seo Ho-chul as Min Tae-seong, the batting coach.

Baseball officials
 Lee Dae-yeon as Kim Jong-moo, general manager of the Vikings.
 Song Young-kyu as Oh Sang-hoon, general manager of the Pelicans.
 Park So-jin as Kim Yeong-chae, a sports announcer.
 Ha Do-kwon as Kang Doo-gi, the national team's ace pitcher.
 Kim Kang-min as Lee Chang-kwon, Vikings player.

Others
 Kim Jung-hwa as Yoo Jeong-in, Seung-soo's ex-wife.
 Yoon Sun-woo as Baek Yeong-soo, Seung-soo's little brother. An expert in sabermetrics, he uses a wheelchair due to a baseball injury as a teenager.
 Yoon Bok-in as Jeong Mi-sook, Se-yeong's mother.
 Jun Gook-hwan as Kwon Il-do, Jaesong Group chairman.
 Lee Kyu-ho as Cheon Heung-man, a former wrestler who knows Seung-soo.
 Lee Yong-woo as Gil Chang-joo / Robert Gil, a translator and a disgraced former pitcher.
 Moon Won-joo as Kim Ki-beom, retired dreams player

Special appearances
 Lee Je-hoon as Lee Je-hoon, CEO of PF Soft (Ep. 16)
 Pengsoo as Pengsoo (Ep. 16)

Production

The series is based on Lee Shin-hwa's screenplay, which was one of the winners in the 2H 2016 MBC Drama Screenplay Contest (Miniseries Category).

Namkoong Min and Park Eun-bin previously worked together as second leads in Hur Jun, The Original Story (2013).

The first script reading took place in September 2019.

Munhak Baseball Stadium, home stadium of the South Korean professional baseball team SK Wyverns who gave their support to the series, served as a filming location and was used in one teaser poster. Scenes taking place in California were filmed in Hawaii.

After episodes 10 and 11 were divided into three parts instead of two, viewers expressed their discontent concerning the advertisements on the program's website.

Following the success of the drama, the cast and crew went on a four-day reward vacation to Saipan on February 17, 2020.

Original soundtrack

Part 1

Part 2

Part 3

Part 4

Part 5

Viewership

Awards and nominations

Notes

See also
Ted Lasso, American comedy series about an American football coach recruited by an English soccer team despite having no experience with the sport

References

External links
  
 
 

2019 South Korean television series debuts
2020 South Korean television series endings
2010s workplace drama television series
2020s workplace drama television series
Baseball television series
Korean-language television shows
South Korean sports television series
South Korean workplace television series
Seoul Broadcasting System television dramas
Television shows set in Incheon
Television shows set in California